Scott Suder (born September 28, 1968) is president of the Wisconsin Paper Council. Previously, he was a politician from Abbotsford, Wisconsin. He was the Republican Majority Leader of the Wisconsin State Assembly, representing the 69th district from January 1998 until September 2013. He was preceded by Robert K. Zukowski and succeeded by Bob Kulp. Suder was a member of the American Legislative Exchange Council (ALEC), serving as Wisconsin state leader.

Background
Suder graduated from University of Wisconsin–Eau Claire in Eau Claire, Wisconsin. He served as an intern for the United States Congress and later served the 69th Assembly District by working as a legislative aide to State Representatives Robert K. Zukowski and Heron "Pink" Van Gorden. Suder also served on the Abbotsford Common Council 1996–2001. Suder had served his sixth term as State Representative for Wisconsin's 69th Assembly District. He is a member of the Wisconsin Air National Guard, and a veteran of Operation Iraqi Freedom. Suder had no challenger in the 2010 Wisconsin General Election.

On September 3, 2013, Suder resigned from the Wisconsin State Assembly to work for the Wisconsin Public Service Commission. However, before starting that job he took a position as a lobbyist for the Wisconsin Paper Council.

Controversy
Suder was key in orchestrating a $500,000 grant in the 2013-2015 Wisconsin state budget. The grant was steered towards, and eventually granted to United Sportsmen. It was later discovered that the group had no experience in the type of work the grant was intended to provide. United Sportsmen had political ties to Wisconsin Republicans. The group also had stated they had non-profit status, which was not accurate; they had applied for non-profit status, but it was still under review and had not been granted.

The grant, as written in the Wisconsin budget, may have violated rules for federal funding and caused Wisconsin to lose $28 million in federal funds. This was avoided when Wisconsin's governor, Scott Walker, used his Line-item veto power to make the grant fully funded by Wisconsin, removing federal funds.

When the Milwaukee Journal Sentinel reported on the issues, Governor Walker rescinded the grant.

Notes

External links
 
Follow the Money – Scott Suder
2008 2006 2004 2002 2000 1998 campaign contributions
Campaign 2008 campaign contributions at Wisconsin Democracy Campaign

1968 births
Living people
Wisconsin city council members
Republican Party members of the Wisconsin State Assembly
University of Wisconsin–Eau Claire alumni
21st-century American politicians
People from Medford, Wisconsin
People from Abbotsford, Wisconsin